E2A Architects is an architecture firm based in Zürich, Switzerland. The office is led by Piet Eckert (*1968, Mumbai) and Wim Eckert (*1969, Zürich) who founded E2A Architects in 2001.

Overview
The brothers Piet Eckert and Wim Eckert both graduated from the ETH Zurich in 1994 and 1995. After their studies they joined OMA, working from 1995 to 1997 in Rotterdam, Los Angeles and Seoul. In 2001 Piet and Wim established E2A Architects. They have taught at several schools and universities in Europe and have been Visiting Professors at the Academy of Architecture in Mendrisio since 2014. Their work has been widely published, including the comprehensive monograph E2A in 2011 with Hatje Cantz, Silent Form in 2014 with Park Books, and more recently the new monograph by 2G Magazine of Gustavo Gili Editors.

Selected projects

Current and completed projects 

 Sportshall Wehntal, Niederweningen, 2019-2021
 Water Police Station, Zurich 2019-2021
 Hofacker School, Zurich, 2018-2022
 Apartment Building Geistlich, Schlieren, 2018-2020
 Taz Media Building, Berlin, 2015-2018
 Europaallee, Baufeld H, Zurich, 2014-2017
 Deaconry Bethanien, Zurich, 2012-2016
 Secondary School Campus Moos, Kilchberg-Rüschlikon, 2014-2016
 Single-Family House B., Staefa, 2013-2015
 Apartment Buildings Escherpark, Zurich, 2012-2015
 Escher Terraces - High-Rise Apartments and Rehearsal Stages, Zurich, 2011-2014
 Trafag Production Hall, Bubikon, 2010-2011
 Auditorium and Library, Staefa, 2009-2010
 Center for Hearing and Language, Zurich, 2007-2017
 Heinrich Böll Foundation, Berlin, 2007-2008
 Triangle House, Winterthur, 2007-2008
 Soccer Training Center and Sports Facilities Juchhof, Zurich, 2006-2007
 Terrace Housing, Meilen, 2004-2005
 Broëlberg Residences, Kilchberg, 2002-2003

Exhibitions

Solo exhibitions 

 Arranging Contradictions – Widersprüchliches ordnen, Exhibition at Munich Architecture Gallery, 2013
 Bodies and Layers, Exhibition at Aedes Architekturforum Berlin, 2012
 Bauten und Projekte, Exhibition at the Galerie Renate Kammer. Architektur und Kunst, Hamburg, 2011
 Serien 2004-09, Exhibition at Architecture Gallery am Weissenhof, Stuttgart, 2010
 Modelle, Exhibition at the Architecture Gallery Luzern, 2010
 Fractions of Reality, Solo presentation within 4th Belgrade International Architecture Week – BINA09, Cultural Centre of Belgrade, Belgrad, Serbia, 2009
 Der ideale Kontext, Exhibition at the Architektur Galerie Berlin, 2008

Publications 

 E2A Architects, Logic and Desire, AV Proyectos 87, Madrid 2018
 Verborgene Vielfalt, Diakonie Bethanien, werk, bauen + wohnen, Zürich 2017
 E2A, Indexpaper Monograph, Indexnewspaper, Porto 2017
 E2A Progetti. Piet Eckert & Wim Eckert, Casa Editrice Libria, Melfi 2016
 E2A, Piet Eckert & Wim Eckert, 2G, Nr. 71, 2015
 Silent Form, E2A, Piet Eckert & Wim Eckert with Jon Naiman, Park Books, Zürich 2014
 E2A Architecture, Piet Eckert & Wim Eckert, Hatje Cantz Verlag, Ostfildern 2012
 E2A Eckert Eckert Architekten, De aedibus, Quart Verlag, Luzern 2006

Awards 

D AM Preis für Architektur in Deutschland 2020, Finalist, taz Neubau, Berlin
Verzinkerpreis 2019, Award, taz Neubau, Berlin
American Architecture Prize 2016, Silver Award for Escherpark Housing Complex, Zurich Switzerland 2015, Silver Award for House B, Staefa, Switzerland 2015, Honorable Mention for Campus Moos, Rüschlikon, Switzerland 2016
 Fritz-Höger-Preis für Backstein-Architektur 2014, Silver Award for Escher Terraces high-rise apartments, Zurich, Switzerland 2014
 Best Architects 13 Award 2013, Auditorium and Library, Staefa, Switzerland 2012
 Deutsches Gütesiegel Nachhaltiges Bauen (DGNB), Gold Label for Baufeld H, Europaallee, Zurich, Switzerland 2012
 Green Good Design Award 2010, Heinrich Böll Stiftung, Berlin, Germany 2010
 Bund Deutscher Architekten (BDA) Award Berlin 2009, Honorable Mention for Heinrich Böll Stiftung, Berlin, Germany 2009
 Schweizer Solarpreis, Sportanlage Juchhof, Zurich, Switzerland 2008
 Best Architects 09 Award 2009, Triangel Haus, Winterthur, Switzerland 2008

References

External links 

 E2A Architects, Homepage
 E2A Architects, Instagram
 S AM Swiss Architecture Museum, E2A, Interview, 2017
 University of Stuttgart, E2A - Der robuste Raum, Lecture, 2016
 Porto Academy 2016, Piet Eckert, Lecture, 2016
 USI Academy of Architecture in Mendrisio, Lezioni di architettura - E2A, Lecture, 2015
 SRF Reflexe, E2A - Die Architekten Wim und Piet Eckert, Interview, 2011
 ETH Zürich, Bauten/bauen - E2A Architekten, Lecture, 2010

Architecture firms of Switzerland
Design companies established in 2001